The 1962–63 A Group was the 15th season of the A Football Group, the top Bulgarian professional league for association football clubs, since its establishment in 1948.

Overview
It was contested by 16 teams, and Spartak Plovdiv won the championship.

League standings

Results

Champions
Spartak Plovdiv

Top scorers

External links
 Bulgaria - List of final tables (RSSSF)
 1962–63 Statistics of A Group at a-pfg.com

First Professional Football League (Bulgaria) seasons
Bulgaria
1962–63 in Bulgarian football